Fulcrum is a large sculpture by American artist Richard Serra installed in 1987 near the western entrance to Liverpool Street station, London, as part of the Broadgate development. Deyan Sudjic, director of the Design Museum, has called it one of London's "design icons".

References

External links
 

1987 sculptures
1987 establishments in England
Buildings and structures in the City of London
Outdoor sculptures in London
Steel sculptures in England
Weathering steel
Sculptures by Richard Serra